is a Japanese footballer who plays as a forward for J2 League club Blaublitz Akita.

Club statistics
Updated to 13 December 2022.

References

External links
Profile at Azul Claro Numazu
Profile at V-Varen Nagasaki

Profile at Tochigi SC

1994 births
Living people
Tokai Gakuen University alumni
Association football people from Aichi Prefecture
Japanese footballers
J2 League players
J3 League players
V-Varen Nagasaki players
Azul Claro Numazu players
Tochigi SC players
FC Gifu players
Association football forwards